The Avogadro constant, commonly denoted  or , is the proportionality factor that relates the number of constituent particles (usually molecules, atoms or ions) in a sample with the amount of substance in that sample. It is named after the Italian scientist Amedeo Avogadro by Stanislao Cannizzaro, who explained this number four years after Avogadro's death while at the Karlsruhe Congress in 1860.

The numeric value of the Avogadro constant expressed in reciprocal moles, a dimensionless number, is called the Avogadro number.

The Avogadro number is the approximate number of nucleons (protons and neutrons) in one gram of ordinary matter. The value of the Avogadro constant was chosen so that the mass of one mole of a chemical compound, expressed in grams, is approximately the number of nucleons in one constituent particle of the substance. It is numerically equal (for all practical purposes) to the average mass of one molecule (or atom) of a compound in daltons (unified atomic mass units); one dalton being  of the mass of one carbon-12 atom. For example, the average mass of one molecule of water is about 18.0153 daltons, and one mole of water ( molecules) is about 18.0153 grams. Thus, the Avogadro constant  is the proportionality factor that relates the molar mass of a substance to the average mass of one molecule.

The Avogadro constant also relates the molar volume of a substance to the average volume nominally occupied by one of its particles, when both are expressed in the same units of volume. For a crystalline substance, it similarly relates its molar volume (in mol/mL), the volume of the repeating unit cell of the crystals (in mL), to the number of molecules in that cell.

The Avogadro number (or constant) has been defined in many different ways through its long history. Its approximate value was first determined, indirectly, by Josef Loschmidt in 1865. (Avogadro's number is closely related to the Loschmidt constant, and the two concepts are sometimes confused.) It was initially defined by Jean Perrin as the number of atoms in 16 grams of oxygen. It was later redefined in the 14th conference of the International Bureau of Weights and Measures (BIPM) as the number of atoms in 12 grams of the isotope carbon-12 (12C). In each case, the mole was defined as the quantity of a substance that contained the same number of atoms as those reference samples. In particular, when carbon-12 was the reference, one mole of carbon-12 was exactly 12 grams of the element.

These definitions meant that the value of the Avogadro number depended on the experimentally determined value of the mass (in grams) of one atom of those elements, and therefore it was known only to a limited number of decimal digits. However, in its 26th Conference, the BIPM adopted a different approach: effective 20 May 2019, it defined the Avogadro number  as the exact value , and redefined the mole as the amount of a substance under consideration that contains  constituent particles of the substance. Under the new definition, the mass of one mole of any substance (including hydrogen, carbon-12, and oxygen-16) is  times the average mass of one of its constituent particles – a physical quantity whose precise value has to be determined experimentally for each substance.

History

Origin of the concept 

The Avogadro constant is named after the Italian scientist Amedeo Avogadro (1776–1856), who, in 1811, first proposed that the volume of a gas (at a given pressure and temperature) is proportional to the number of atoms or molecules regardless of the nature of the gas.

The name Avogadro's number was coined in 1909 by the physicist Jean Perrin, who defined it as the number of molecules in exactly 16 grams of oxygen. The goal of this definition was to make the mass of a mole of a substance, in grams, be numerically equal to the mass of one molecule relative to the mass of the hydrogen atom; which, because of the law of definite proportions, was the natural unit of atomic mass, and was assumed to be 1/16 of the atomic mass of oxygen.

First measurements 

The value of Avogadro's number (not yet known by that name) was first obtained indirectly by Josef Loschmidt in 1865, by estimating the number of particles in a given volume of gas. This value, the number density  of particles in an ideal gas, is now called the Loschmidt constant in his honor, and is related to the Avogadro constant, by
,
Because of this work, the symbol  is sometimes used for the Avogadro constant, and, in German literature, that name may be used for both constants, distinguished only by the units of measurement. (However,  should not be confused with the entirely different Loschmidt constant in English-language literature.)

Perrin himself determined Avogadro's number by several different experimental methods. He was awarded the 1926 Nobel Prize in Physics, largely for this work.

The electric charge per mole of electrons is a constant called the Faraday constant and has been known since 1834, when Michael Faraday published his works on electrolysis. In 1910, Robert Millikan  with the help of Harvey Fletcher obtained the first measurement of the charge on an electron. Dividing the charge on a mole of electrons by the charge on a single electron provided a more accurate estimate of the Avogadro number.

SI definition of 1971
In 1971, the International Bureau of Weights and Measures (BIPM) decided to regard the amount of substance as an independent dimension of measurement, with the mole as its base unit in the International System of Units (SI).

By this definition, the common rule of thumb that "one gram of matter contains  nucleons" was exact for carbon-12, but slightly inexact for other elements and isotopes. On the other hand, one mole of any substance contained exactly as many molecules as one mole of any other substance.

As a consequence of this definition, in the SI system the Avogadro constant  had the dimensionality of reciprocal of amount of substance rather than of a pure number, and had the approximate value  with units of mol. By this definition, the value of  inherently had to be determined experimentally.

The BIPM also named  the "Avogadro constant", but the term "Avogadro number" continued to be used especially in introductory works.

SI redefinition of 2019 

In 2017, the BIPM decided to change the definitions of mole and amount of substance. The mole was redefined as being the amount of substance containing exactly  elementary entities. One consequence of this change is that the mass of a mole of 12C atoms is no longer exactly 0.012 kg. Thus, the molar mass constant is no longer exactly 1 g/mol, although the difference ( in relative terms, as of March 2019) is insignificant for practical purposes.

Connection to other constants 

The Avogadro constant  is related to other physical constants and properties.

 It relates the molar gas constant  and the Boltzmann constant , which in the SI is defined to be exactly :
 
 It relates the Faraday constant  and the elementary charge , which in the SI is defined as exactly :
 
 It relates the molar mass constant  and the atomic mass constant  currently

See also 
 Mole Day
 CODATA 2018
 List of scientists whose names are used in physical constants

References

External links 
 1996 definition of the Avogadro constant from the IUPAC Compendium of Chemical Terminology ("Gold Book")
 Some Notes on Avogadro's Number,  (historical notes)
 An Exact Value for Avogadro's Number – American Scientist
 Avogadro and molar Planck constants for the redefinition of the kilogram
 
 Scanned version of "Two hypothesis of Avogadro", 1811 Avogadro's article, on BibNum

Amount of substance
Fundamental constants
Dimensionless numbers of chemistry
Physical constants